The Irish League in season 1989–90 comprised 14 teams, and Portadown won the championship.

League standings

Results

References
Northern Ireland - List of final tables (RSSSF)

NIFL Premiership seasons
1989–90 in Northern Ireland association football
Northern